Gillellus is a genus of sand stargazers, found in the eastern central Pacific Ocean and western central Atlantic Ocean.

Species
There are currently 10 recognized species in this genus:
 Gillellus arenicola C. H. Gilbert, 1890 (Sandy stargazer)
 Gillellus chathamensis C. E. Dawson, 1977 (Cocos stargazer)
 Gillellus greyae Kanazawa, 1952 (Arrow stargazer)
 Gillellus healae C. E. Dawson, 1982 (Masked stargazer)
 Gillellus inescatus J. T. Williams, 2002
 Gillellus jacksoni C. E. Dawson, 1982
 Gillellus ornatus C. H. Gilbert, 1892 (Ornate stargazer)
 Gillellus searcheri C. E. Dawson, 1977 (Searcher stargazer)
 Gillellus semicinctus C. H. Gilbert, 1890 (Half-banded stargazer)
 Gillellus uranidea J. E. Böhlke, 1968 (Warteye stargazer)

Etymology
The name of this genus is a diminutive of the surname Gill and is in honour of the American zoologist Theodore Nicholas Gill (1837-1914) of the Smithsonian Institution.

References

 
Dactyloscopidae
Marine fish genera
Taxa named by Charles Henry Gilbert